Window Warriors is an American reality competition series on Game Show Network which premiered November 15, 2016.

Contestants
(Contestants names and locations are stated on website and during the show.)

Contestant Progress

 The contestant won.
 The contestant came in second-place.
 The contestant came in third-place
 The contestant won the challenge.
 The contestant was in the top.
 The contestant was in the bottom two.
 The contestant was eliminated.
 The contestant returned as a guest for the finale episode.

Episodes

References

External links

2010s American reality television series
2016 American television series debuts
English-language television shows
Game Show Network original programming